MediaJustice is a national non-profit organization based in Oakland, California established in 2008.  Until 2019 MediaJustice was known as the Center for Media Justice and it was founded by Malkia Cyril and its current Executive Director is Steven Renderos. The organization's mission is "to build a powerful movement for a more just and participatory media and digital world—with racial equity and human rights for all."

Background
In 2002, leaders from We Interrupt This Message and Race Forward (formerly the Applied Research Center) launched the Youth Media Council (YMC) to counter media bias against California’s youth and people of color. As the project grew, it expanded to address inequities in media access and coverage in diverse communities by collaborating with local social justice groups nationwide. With technical support from the Movement Strategy Center, YMC staff organized these groups into the Media Action Grassroots Network (MAG-Net), and evolved to become the Center for Media Justice (CMJ). Launched in 2008, CMJ is now a nationally recognized organizing hub representing the media policy interests and building the cultural leadership of hundreds of social justice groups across the United States.

Vision

MediaJustice has a vision that states, "MediaJustice is a long-term vision to democratize the economy, government, and society through policies and practices that ensure: democratic media ownership, fundamental communication rights; universal media and technology access, and meaningful, accurate representation within news and popular culture for everyone."

MediaJustice believes that MediaJustice will be achieved when the media and cultural environment results in connected communities, fair economies, racial justice and human rights for all people; and lifts up the voices of communities of color, low-income people, and other under-represented communities.

See also
 Media activism

Further reading
Published by the Youth Media Council
 Is KMEL the people's station? : a community assessment of 106.1 KMEL. 2002
 Speaking for ourselves : a youth assessment of local news coverage. 2002
 The Bay Area media map : a youth organizer's guide to the media turf in the Bay Area and beyond. 2003
 Displacing the dream : a report on Bay Area newspaper coverage of development and gentrification. [2008?]

External links
 MediaJustice.org official website
 Media Action Grassroots Network (a project of the Center for Media Justice)

References 

Citizen mass media in the United States
Organizations based in Oakland, California
2001 establishments in the United States
Mass media in the San Francisco Bay Area
Media analysis organizations and websites